Mher is an Armenian given name. Notable people with the name include:

 Mher Avanesyan
 Mher Grigoryan
 Mher Mesropyan
 Mher Khachatryan
 Frunzik Mkrtchyan
 Mher Mkrtchyan (disambiguation), several people
 Mher Mkrtchyan (cyclist)
 Mher Khachatryan (painter)

Armenian given names